Zhang Hao is the name of:

Zhang Hao (general) (died 908), military and political figure of Yang Wu in the late Tang dynasty and early Five Dynasties period
Zhang Hao (triple jumper) (born 1978), Chinese triple jumper
Zhang Hao (figure skater) (born 1984), Chinese pair skater
Zhang Hao (footballer) (born 1994), Chinese association footballer

See also
Chang Hao (sailor) (born 1990), Taiwanese windsurfer